Pacificulla ignigera is a moth in the family Lecithoceridae. It was described by Edward Meyrick in 1938. It is endemic to New Guinea.

References

ignigera
Moths of New Guinea
Endemic fauna of New Guinea
Moths described in 1938
Taxa named by Edward Meyrick